Matías Ezequiel Favano Otermín (born 4 July 1980 in Buenos Aires, Argentina) is an Argentine former professional footballer who played as a midfielder. He played with the Giants Polish club Lech Poznań.

Clubs
 Platense 2001–2002
 Racing Club de Montevideo 2002
 Universidad de Concepción 2003–2004
 Deportivo Español 2004
 Lech Poznań 2005
 Polonia Warsaw 2006
 Campobasso Calcio 2006
 Pomezia Calcio 2007–2008
 ASD Albalonga 2009
 Pro Cisterna 2009
 Universitario de Sucre 2010
 Pro Cisterna 2011
 C.A.I 2012

References
 
 

1980 births
Living people
Argentine footballers
Association football midfielders
Chilean Primera División players
Ekstraklasa players
Bolivian Primera División players
Club Atlético Platense footballers
Racing Club de Montevideo players
Universidad de Concepción footballers
Deportivo Español footballers
Lech Poznań players
Polonia Warsaw players
Universitario de Sucre footballers
Argentine expatriate footballers
Argentine expatriate sportspeople in Chile
Expatriate footballers in Chile
Argentine expatriate sportspeople in Bolivia
Expatriate footballers in Bolivia
Argentine expatriate sportspeople in Italy
Expatriate footballers in Italy
Argentine expatriate sportspeople in Poland
Expatriate footballers in Poland
Argentine expatriate sportspeople in Uruguay
Expatriate footballers in Uruguay
Footballers from Buenos Aires